Urophylleae is a tribe of flowering plants in the family Rubiaceae and contains 237 species in 6 genera. Its representatives are found in the tropics.

Genera 
Currently accepted names
 Amphidasya Standl. (13 sp) - Central and Southern Tropical America
 Antherostele Bremek. (5 sp) - Philippines
 Pauridiantha Hook.f. (50 sp) - Tropical Africa and Madagascar
 Praravinia Korth. (49 sp) - Malesia
 Raritebe Wernham (1 sp) - Central America to Peru
 Urophyllum Jack ex Wall. (119 sp) - Southern China to Tropical Asia

Synonyms

 Aulacodiscus Hook.f. = Urophyllum
 Axanthes Blume = Urophyllum
 Axanthopsis Korth. = Urophyllum
 Commitheca Bremek. = Pauridiantha
 Cymelonema C.Pres. = Urophyllum
 Dukea Dwyer = Raritebe
 Maschalanthe Blume = Urophyllum
 Maschalocorymbus Bremek. = Urophyllum
 Pamplethantha Bremek. = Pauridiantha
 Paravinia Hassk. = Praravinia
 Pittierothamnus Steyerm. = Amphidasya
 Pleiocarpidia K.Schum. = Urophyllum
 Poecilocalyx Bremek. = Pauridiantha
 Pravinaria Bremek. = Urophyllum
 Stelechantha Bremek. = Pauridiantha
 Wallichia Reinw. ex Blume = Urophyllum
 Williamsia Merr. = Praravinia

References 

Rubioideae tribes